Nagornoye is a rural locality (a village) in Lavrovskoye Rural Settlement, Sudogodsky District, Vladimir Oblast, Russia. The population was 1 as of 2010.

Geography 
Nagornoye is located on the Sineborka River, 26 km north of Sudogda (the district's administrative centre) by road. Smykovo is the nearest rural locality.

References 

Rural localities in Sudogodsky District